Xanthodexia is a genus of parasitic flies in the family Tachinidae.

Species
Xanthodexia semipicta (Walker, 1853)
Xanthodexia sericea (Wiedemann, 1830)

References

Diptera of South America
Diptera of North America
Dexiinae
Tachinidae genera
Taxa named by Frederik Maurits van der Wulp